Dr. Felix Ladu is a South Sudanese physician and politician. As of 2011, he is the Health Advisor for the state of Central Equatoria.

References

21st-century South Sudanese politicians
Living people
South Sudanese physicians
Year of birth missing (living people)
People from Central Equatoria
Place of birth missing (living people)